Margarella tropidophoroides is a species of sea snail, a marine gastropod mollusk in the family Calliostomatidae.

Description
The shell grows to a height of 19 mm.

Distribution
This marine species occurs off South Georgia Islands at depths between 12 m and 55 m.

References

 Strebel, H. 1908. Die Gastropoden (mit Ausnahme de nackten Opisthobranchier). Wissenschaftliche Ergebnisse der Schwedischen Südpolar-Expedition 1901-1903 6(1): 111 pp., 6 pls

External links
 To Biodiversity Heritage Library (4 publications)
 To Encyclopedia of Life
 To World Register of Marine Species
 

tropidophoroides
Gastropods described in 1908